Cleves is a village in Miami Township, Hamilton County, Ohio, United States, located along the Ohio River. The population was 3,414 at the 2020 census. Founded in 1818, it is named for John Cleves Symmes who lived here, laid out the original town site, and sold lots.

Geography
Cleves is located at  (39.161241, -84.750288) between the Great Miami River and the Ohio River. It is separated from the Ohio River by the village of North Bend, along the southern border of Cleves. U.S. Route 50 passes through the village, leading east  to downtown Cincinnati and west to Lawrenceburg, Indiana.

Demographics

2010 census
As of the census of 2010, there were 3,234 people, 1,079 households, and 823 families living in the village. The racial makeup of the village was 96.9% White, 0.6% African American, 0.4% Native American, 0.4% Asian, 0.1% from other races, and 1.6% from two or more races. Hispanic or Latino of any race were 1.2% of the population.

There were 1,079 households, of which 46.2% had children under the age of 18 living with them, 57.2% were married couples living together, 13.2% had a female householder with no husband present, 5.9% had a male householder with no wife present, and 23.7% were non-families. 19.4% of all households were made up of individuals, and 7.1% had someone living alone who was 65 years of age or older. The average household size was 3.00 and the average family size was 3.45.

The median age in the village was 33.2 years. 32.5% of residents were under the age of 18; 7.7% were between the ages of 18 and 24; 28.3% were from 25 to 44; 23.8% were from 45 to 64; and 7.7% were 65 years of age or older. The gender makeup of the village was 50.3% male and 49.7% female.

2000 census
As of the census of 2000, there were 2,790 people, 960 households, and 750 families living in the village. The population density was 1,754.7 people per square mile (677.5/km2). There were 1,020 housing units at an average density of 641.5 per square mile (247.7/km2). The racial makeup of the village was 98.21% White, 0.57% African American, 0.14% Native American, 0.14% Asian, 0.14% Pacific Islander, 0.07% from other races, and 0.72% from two or more races. Hispanic or Latino of any race were 0.36% of the population.

There were 960 households, out of which 43.5% had children under the age of 18 living with them, 61.8% were married couples living together, 10.6% had a female householder with no husband present, and 21.8% were non-families. 17.6% of all households were made up of individuals, and 7.8% had someone living alone who was 65 years of age or older. The average household size was 2.91 and the average family size was 3.30.

In the village, the population was spread out, with 31.4% under the age of 18, 7.7% from 18 to 24, 33.8% from 25 to 44, 18.1% from 45 to 64, and 9.0% who were 65 years of age or older. The median age was 33 years. For every 100 females there were 100.1 males. For every 100 females age 18 and over, there were 96.1 males.

The median income for a household in the village was $47,553, and the median income for a family was $50,926. Males had a median income of $32,917 versus $25,000 for females. The per capita income for the village was $17,617. About 6.3% of families and 7.6% of the population were below the poverty line, including 10.6% of those under age 18 and none of those age 65 or over.

Notable person
 Les Backman, Major League Baseball pitcher

References

External links
 Village website

Villages in Hamilton County, Ohio
Villages in Ohio
Populated places established in 1818
1818 establishments in Massachusetts